Olimjon Boboyev (born in Hisor, January 5, 1952) is a Tajikistani politician who is opposed to the rule of current President Emomali Rahmon. The leader of the Party of Economic Reforms, he was the main opposition candidate in Tajikistan's 2006 presidential election. According to official publications, he gained 6.2% of the popular vote.

Founder of the Party of Economic Reforms of Tajikistan.

References

1952 births
Tajikistani politicians
Living people
Members of the Tajik Academy of Sciences